Cheeta Camp (also known as Cheetah Camp) is a low lying area near Trombay, Mumbai, Maharashtra. It is a part of Municipal M-East Ward and located along the Arabian Seafront.

Brihanmumbai Municipal Corporation provides several public services such as hospitals, schools, cleanup, etc.

History 
In 1976, between 55,000 and 70,000 people were forcibly moved overnight to Cheeta Camp from the Janata Colony slum by 12,000 police. The surprise eviction of Janata Colony was to make space for the expansion of the Bhabha Atomic Research Centre (BARC).

In 2001, the Indian Navy raised concerns that the slum was too close to an arms depot. At this time, it was estimated there were 10,000 shacks in Cheeta Colony. There were five schools, a graveyard, a crematorium and four toilet blocks were being built. As per the current estimate more than 1 Lakh people live in the cheeta camp. The development in this area is restricted and the navy depot which reside in the north to the cheeta camp raised concerns regarding the building infrastructure's Floor levels and were limited to two floors and the ownership of the land is limited to the owner and the government can shift them as they did in 2001.

Geography 
Trombay is a nearby village and post office. It comes under Anushakti Nagar Assembly Constituency.

This area is majorly covered by Slums and Chawls. Areas in Cheeta Camp is further divided into Sectors. Peoples with different religions and cultures are residing here.

Schools and Colleges in Cheeta Camp 
 Vivekananda English High School
 Sir Sayed English High School
 Trombay Public High School
 
 Devi Ekveera Shikshan Mandal Vidya Sankul
 Ideal High School and Junior College
 Municipal Corporation Schools
 Peace Public School
 Star English High School
 Abhinav Dnyanmandir Trombay School
 Crescent High School

News 
The 3D vision of Cheeta Camp

See also 
Lalubhai Compound
Deonar dumping ground
Mankhurd

References 

Mumbai